Old Trafford is the home of Manchester United F.C.

Old Trafford may also refer to:
Old Trafford (area), a district of Trafford, England
Old Trafford Cricket Ground, home of Lancashire County Cricket Club
Old Trafford Halt or Manchester United Football Ground railway station, a railway station with a direct connection to the football ground
Old Trafford tram stop, a Metrolink stop adjacent to the cricket ground
Naivasha Stadium or Old Trafford, in Naivasha, Kenya
Old Trafford Medical Center, a hostpotal in St. George's, Grenada